The Assumption School is a historic school building in Saint Paul in the U.S. state of Minnesota. It was built in 1864 of local quarter-cut limestone.  It had a central cupola, which has been replaced.  The school is affiliated with the nearby Church of the Assumption.

The building, in 1974, was "in a good state of preservation although it has not been used as a school since 1888. It presently serves as quarters for the parish caretaker and is maintained by the Assumption Church."  The building has been documented by the Historic American Buildings Survey program.

References

Defunct schools in Minnesota
Italianate architecture in Minnesota
National Register of Historic Places in Saint Paul, Minnesota
Properties of religious function on the National Register of Historic Places in Minnesota
School buildings completed in 1864
School buildings on the National Register of Historic Places in Minnesota